Procyclins also known as procyclic acidic repetitive proteins or PARP are proteins developed in the surface coating of Trypanosoma brucei parasites while in their tsetse fly vector. The cell surface of the bloodstream form features a dense coat of variable surface glycoproteins (VSGs) which is replaced by an equally dense coat of procyclins when the parasite differentiates into the procylic form in the tsetse fly midgut.

There are six or seven procyclin genes that encode unusual proteins with extensive tandem repeat units of glutamic acid (E) and proline (P), referred to as EP repeats (EP1, EP1-2, EP2, EP2-1, EP3, EP3-2, EP3-4), and two genes that encode proteins with internal pentapeptide GPEET repeats (GPEET2).

EP1 is a 141 amino acids protein and EP2 is a 129 AA protein. Both proteins have their coding genes situated on chromosome 10. GPEET2 is a 114 AA protein and EP3-2 is 123 AA protein with genes situated on chromosome 6.

See also 
 Coat protein (disambiguation)

References

External links 

Kinetoplastid proteins
Parasitic excavates